Lee Dong-geun may refer to:
Lee Dong-geun (footballer, born 1981)
Lee Dong-geun (footballer, born 1988)
Lee Dong-keun (badminton) (born 1990)
Lee Dong-keun (curler) (이동건, born 1979)